Dato' Seri Dr. Ahmad Zahid bin Hamidi (born 4 January 1953) is a Malaysian politician who has served Deputy Prime Minister and Minister of Rural and Regional Development since December 2022. A member of the United Malays National Organisation (UMNO), he has served as its leader and the chairman of the Barisan Nasional (BN) coalition since May 2018. Zahid has been the Member of Parliament (MP) for Bagan Datuk since April 1995.

Born in Perak, Zahid studied and began a career in banking before entering politics. He served in several cabinet positions under former Prime Ministers Abdullah Ahmad Badawi and Najib Razak from March 2008 to May 2018. He was also Deputy Prime Minister from July 2015 to May 2018. Zahid became the President of the UMNO in 2018 following the party's defeat at the 2018 election. He served as the 14th Leader of the Opposition from July 2018 to March 2019. Under his leadership, UMNO and BN won at the 2021 Malacca state election and the 2022 Johor state election, but achieved its worst result in Malaysian history at the 2022 federal election. After BN formed a coalition government with Pakatan Harapan, he was appointed as Deputy Prime Minister of Malaysia on in December 2022, making him the first person to be appointed to this position twice, under two different administrations.

Zahid has faced several investigations and charges for corruption during his career.

Early life
Ahmad Zahid bin Hamidi was born on 4 January 1953 in Bagan Datuk, Perak, the eldest son of nine children (seven sons and two daughters) in the family. On 1 October 2011, his mother, Tuminah Abdul Jalil, died of a stroke and heart complication in her hometown Sungai Nipah Darat, Bagan Datoh. She was previously hospitalized at the Tuanku Mizan Armed Forces Hospital in Kuala Lumpur. Both of his parents are Indonesian-born Malaysians.

He was raised by a Chinese foster-father, Chen Jin Ting and sold ice cream together for six years with his foster family when he was in elementary school. Chen was not highly educated and would cycle from his house at Simpang Tiga, Hilir Perak to about three kilometers away selling ice cream. Chen was married with his foster mother, Guo Jin Luan. His father later died in 1999, more than ten days after the general election of that year. Following accusations that he was anti-Chinese, he responded asking: "Am I anti-Chinese when I have a Chinese foster father?".

Education and early career
Before venturing into politics, Ahmad Zahid studied at University of Malaya for his bachelor's degree where he graduated in 1976. He also holds a Certificate in Banking from Bank Negara Malaysia before being a banker for OCBC. He then became one of the directors of Bank Simpanan Nasional (1995–1998) and Permodalan Nasional Berhad (PNB). During his corporate career, he was a Marketing Executive for Amanah Saham Nasional Berhad (ASNB), Executive Director for Scandinavian Motors Sdn Bhd, Chief Executive Officer of Kretam Holdings Berhad, Chairman of Tekala Corporation Berhad, Seng Hup Berhad and Ramatex Berhad. In 1999 he became the Chairman of Syarikat Perumahan Negara Berhad (SPNB).
In 2008, he received his PhD in Communication at Universiti Putra Malaysia after he spent seven years to complete his thesis.

Political career

Political secretary and UMNO Youth Chief 
In 1986, Zahid was appointed political secretary to Najib Razak during the latter's term as Youth Minister (1986–1990) and then Minister of Defence (1990–1995).

He was elected UMNO Youth Chief in 1996. He was once the chief of UMNO youth Bagan Datoh branch, the Vice Chief for the state of Perak UMNO youth, Head of the UMNO Communication for UMNO youth.

Election to Parliament and UMNO Supreme Council 
In 1995, Ahmad Zahid Hamidi became a member of parliament after winning the Bagan Datoh parliamentary seat in Perak in the general elections.

In 1999, Zahid was re-elected Member of Parliament for Bagan Datoh in Perak in the general elections. He was elected to the UMNO Supreme Council in the following year.

Ministerial career 

After he won the seat for a third time in the 2004 general elections, Zahid was appointed Deputy Tourism Minister by former Prime Minister Abdullah Ahmad Badawi. While being a Deputy Minister, he pursued a Doctor of Philosophy degree from UPM, thesis entitled Barisan Nasional Manifesto As Agenda for Malay Language Newspaper During the General Election Campaign.

In the political tsunami of 2008, Zahid again retained his Bagan Datoh parliamentary seat at a time when many BN party heavyweights were trounced. He was then appointed a full Minister in the Prime Minister's Department. In the April 2009 cabinet reshuffle, Zahid was appointed Minister of Defence by Prime Minister Najib Razak.

He was able to retain his parliamentary seat of Bagan Datoh in the 2013 election, although with a decreased majority. He was appointed as Minister of Home Affairs in 2013, replacing Hishamuddin Hussein, who took Zahid's previous position at the Ministry of Defence.

In July 2015, he was appointed the country's 11th Deputy Prime Minister in a cabinet reshuffle.

UMNO President 

In the 2018 UMNO leadership election, Zahid gained more votes than his rivals, Khairy Jamaluddin and Tengku Razaleigh Hamzah, making him the new president of UMNO and also the first Leader of the Opposition from BN coalition.

After facing weeks of mounting pressure to step down as party president and calls for fresh party polls, Zahid finally announces his decision to temporary step down and take leave on 18 December 2018. His deputy, Mohamad Hasan, acted the position of leading the party. On 30 June 2019, he announced his return from "garden leave" back to active role as UMNO president.

In the 2022 election, he led the party to achieve its worst result in Malaysian history, only retaining 26 out of 222 seats (BN won 30 seats). Several key figures including Tengku Razaleigh Hamzah, Mahdzir Khalid, Azeez Rahim, Tengku Zafrul Aziz and Khairy Jamaluddin, lost to either PN or PH candidates. UMNO/BN was also defeated at several state elections held in Pahang and Perak, and lost all seats in Perlis. Zahid himself was re-elected with a slim majority. Following the election defeat, he faced internal pressures to resign as the UMNO President.

Controversies and issues

Legal suits 
Ahmad Zahid had been sued by businessman Amir Bazli Abdullah for allegedly punching him in the face on 16 January 2006 at the Country Heights recreational club in Kajang, Selangor, causing the latter to suffer a nasal bone fracture and a swollen left eye. The case was pursued in the civil courts for six years before the matter was settled out of court.

Controversial statements 
Shortly after the Black 505 rallies following the 13th Malaysian General Election due to claims of electoral fraud and vote manipulation, he said that Malaysians who are unhappy with the country's political system and dislike the BN government should "get lost" from the country. This statement has raised discontentment among the citizens, putting a serious question mark over his political future in a multiracial society. The statement was made after a series of street demonstrations led by opposition parties that has refused to accept the results of the 13th Malaysian General election. His first act as Home Minister was to order a crack down against opposition leaders and dissent, landing him in a bigger controversy with sedition laws being used to attempt to suppress the voices of opposition parties.

During a speech in Malacca, Zahid was recorded endorsing the police policy of "shoot to kill" when arresting dangerous criminals, including backing a certain group of gangsters.

Corruption charges 
On 18 October 2018, Zahid was arrested by the Malaysian Anti-Corruption Commission (MACC) and charged in court the following day on 45 counts of criminal breach of trust (CBT), abuse of power and money laundering involving a total of RM114 million (about US$27.4 million) funds of Yayasan Akalbudi. On 14 December 2018, he was charged with another  CBT offence, involving RM10 million. On 20 February 2019, Zahid was again charged with an additional CBT charge, involving RM260,000.

On 26 June 2019, Zahid became the subject of 7 new corruption charges involving S$4.2  million (RM12.8 million) which he allegedly received from a foreign visa (VLN) system operator totalling RM42.76 million under his capacity as the Home Minister then.  On the next day, he faced 33 more charges totalling RM42.76 million involving the VLN system two years before. The latest charges brought the total number of outstanding charges to 87.

On 24 January 2022, Zahid has been ordered to enter his defence against all 47 criminal breach of trust (CBT), corruption and money laundering charges involving funds.

On 17 February 2022, former prime minister Muhyiddin Yassin has divulged more details regarding his claims that Ahmad Zahid sought his intervention in court cases. Muhyiddin said Zahid visited a few days after he took office as prime minister with a pile of files. He said he refused to interfere in Zahid and Najib Razak's court cases, which incited their anger and resulted in attempts to destabilise the government.

On 23 February 2022, Mahathir Mohamad said he had a meeting with Zahid before the former became prime minister in 2018. Mahathir said Zahid went to his house with three other individuals and tried to be nice to him to avoid being charged for his misconduct when Umno was in power.

Acquittal 
On 23 September 2022, Zahid was acquitted by the Malaysian High Court of 40 bribery charges linked to a visa scheme, and seven charges for allegedly receiving bribes when he was home minister from 2013 to 2018.

Personal life
He is married to Hamidah Khamis and has 5 children. He is fluent in Standard Malay, local Perak Malay and Javanese. He speaks English, but not fluently, and also speaks some Mandarin.

Election results

Honours

Honours of Malaysia
  :
  Knight Commander of the Order of the Crown of Kelantan (DPMK) – Dato' (2005)
  Knight Grand Commander of the Order of the Life of the Crown of Kelantan (SJMK) – Dato' (2009)
  :
  Companion Class I of the Exalted Order of Malacca (DMSM) – Datuk (1993)
  Knight Grand Commander of the Exalted Order of Malacca (DUNM) – Datuk Seri Utama (2015)
  :
  Grand Knight of the Order of Sultan Ahmad Shah of Pahang (SSAP) – Dato’ Sri (2008)
  :
 Member of the Order of the Perak State Crown (AMP) (1992)
  Knight Commander of the Order of the Perak State Crown (DPMP) – Dato' (2001)
  Knight Grand Commander of the Order of the Perak State Crown (SPMP) – Dato' Seri (2008)
  Ordinary Class of the Perak Family Order of Sultan Nazrin Shah (SPSN) – Dato' Seri Diraja (2015)
  :
  Grand Commander of the Order of Kinabalu (SPDK) – Datuk Seri Panglima (2011)
  :
  Knight Commander of the Order of the Star of Sarawak (PNBS) – Dato' Sri (2013)
  Knight Grand Commander of the Order of the Star of Hornbill Sarawak (DP) – Datuk Patinggi (2016)

See also
Bagan Datok (federal constituency)
List of people who have served in both Houses of the Malaysian Parliament

References

External links

  
 
 

|-

 
 

1953 births
Living people
People from Perak
Malaysian people of Javanese descent
Malaysian people of Malay descent
Malaysian Muslims
United Malays National Organisation politicians
Presidents of United Malays National Organisation
Members of the Dewan Rakyat
Members of the Dewan Negara
Deputy Prime Ministers of Malaysia
Malaysian Leaders of the Opposition
Government ministers of Malaysia
University of Putra Malaysia alumni
Grand Commanders of the Order of Kinabalu
Knights Grand Commander of the Order of the Star of Hornbill Sarawak
Knights Commander of the Most Exalted Order of the Star of Sarawak
21st-century Malaysian politicians